Giacomo Appiotti (1873–1948) was Lieutenant General of the Italian Army during the Second Italo-Abyssinian War.

He was the commanding officer of the 12th Brigade from 1929 to 1933. In 1935 he was the general commanding the 3rd Black Shirt Division XXI Aprile in Ethiopia during the Second Italo-Abyssinian War. He served as a member of the Commission of Affairs of Italian Africa, of the Italian Senate from 1939 to 1943 during World War II. In 1943 he was President of the Administration Council of the Military Union.

External links
 Generals of World War II, Italy, Giacomo Appiotti

1873 births
1948 deaths
Italian military personnel of the Second Italo-Ethiopian War
Italian generals
Italian military personnel of World War I
Italian military personnel of World War II